Pterocerina nigricauda is a species of ulidiid or picture-winged fly in the genus Pterocerina of the family Ulidiidae.

References

nigricauda
Insects described in 1938